The First Federal Electoral District of Baja California (I Distrito Electoral Federal de Baja California) is one of the 300 Electoral Districts into which Mexico is divided for the purpose of elections to the federal Chamber of Deputies and one of eight such districts in the state of Baja California.

It elects one deputy to the lower house of Congress for each three-year legislative period, by means of the first past the post system.

District territory
Under the 2005 redistricting process, it is made up of the municipality of Mexicali, with the exception of its extreme northwest (where the state's Third District is located)
and its extreme northeast (which corresponds to the Second District).

The district's head town (cabecera distrital), where results from individual polling stations are gathered together and collated, is the state capital, the city of  Mexicali.

Previous districting schemes

1996–2005 district
Between 1996 and 2005, this electoral district covered the whole of the municipality of Mexicali, except for a small pocket in the east of the city of Mexicali, which was part of the Second District.

Deputies returned to Congress from this district 

L Legislature
 1976–1979: Ricardo Eguía Valderrama (PRI)
LI Legislature
 1979–1982: José Luis Andrade Ibarra (PRI)
LII Legislature
 1982–1985:
LIII Legislature
 1985–1988:
LIV Legislature
 1988–1991: Jesús Armando Hernández Montaño (PRI)
LV Legislature
 1991–1994: José Ramírez Román (PRI)
LVI Legislature
 1994–1997: Martina Montenegro Espinoza (PRI)
LVII Legislature
 1997–2000: Roberto Pérez de Alva (PRI)
LVIII Legislature
 2000–2003: Juvenal Vidrio Rodríguez (PAN)
LIX Legislature
 2003–2006: Hidalgo Contreras Covarrubias (PAN)
LX Legislature
 2006–2009: Francisco Rueda Gómez (PAN)

References

Federal electoral districts of Mexico
Baja California